Peter M. Wolf is an American author, land planning and urban policy authority, investment manager, and philanthropist. He lives in New York City.

Early biography
Peter Michael Wolf,  a fifth-generation member of the Godchaux-Weis-Wolf family, was born in New Orleans. He is the author of several books, including the biography The Sugar King: Leon Godchaux, A New Orleans Legend, His Creole Slave, and His Jewish Roots and his memoir, My New Orleans, Gone Away – A Memoir of Loss and Renewal. Wolf attended Metairie Park Country Day School, Phillips Exeter Academy, Yale University (BA), Tulane University (MA), and New York University Institute of Fine Arts (PhD). At Yale, he was elected to the Manuscript Society and the Elizabethan Club, and served as a board member and the publicity manager of the Yale Daily News. During his graduate studies, he was awarded a Fulbright Fellowship in Paris. His doctoral dissertation was published internationally in 1968, Eugène Hénard and the Beginning of Urbanism in Paris 1900–1914. In 1969, it became the basis for a solo exhibition at the Museum of Modern Art in New York.

Wolf has been awarded grants for his writing and scholarship by the Ford Foundation, the National Endowment for the Arts, the Graham Foundation for Advanced Studies in the Fine Arts, and the National Research and Education Trust Fund. He has twice been a visiting artist/scholar at the American Academy in Rome.

Wolf's career in urbanism began at Wilbur Smith Associates, where he engaged in land planning focused on transportation. He began teaching urbanism as an  adjunct professor at the School of Architecture at the Cooper Union for the Advancement of Science and Art in 1971, and continued in that role through 1987. Wolf also began working for the Institute for Architecture and Urban Studies in 1971, participating in a number of research initiatives, including: "The Street as a Component of the Urban Environment" (co-director with architect Peter Eisenman, 1971–1973);  "Low-Rise High-Density Prototype" (co-director with professor Kenneth Frampton, 1971–1973); and Union Square Redevelopment Program (director, 1972–1973). From 1972–1982 Wolf served as chairman of the IAUS Board of Fellows and as a trustee.

Between 1965 and 1990, Wolf authored numerous studies and articles related to land use and open space planning for the Office of the Manhattan Borough President, the Department of Housing and Urban Development, Pan American World Airways, and private land owners across the US. His study, "Shaker Heritage Historic District," commissioned by the National Endowment for the Arts, the New York State Council on the Arts, the Shaker Central Trust Fund, and the Historical Society of the Town of Colonie, New York, was instrumental in saving the first Shaker settlement in America, a National Register of Historic Places property. In 1987, as the consultant to the Village of East Hampton, New York, he rewrote the East Hampton Village Residential Zoning Ordinance and, in 2002, he served as senior advisor to the Town of East Hampton Comprehensive Plan.

Between 1970 and 2007, as owner of Peter Wolf Associates, Wolf represented private land owners, institutions, corporations, and communities in land use studies and land investment management projects.

Recent biography
Between 2008 and 2015, Peter Wolf Associates served as an investment manager on behalf of individuals, trusts, pension plans, and estates.

In 2010, Wolf founded and served as the chairman of the Thomas Moran Trust, a nonprofit dedicated to the restoration of the Thomas Moran House, the studio house and gardens of painter Thomas Moran and printmaker Mary Nimmo Moran, a National Historic Property. In 2012, he was appointed to the Advisory Committee of the Quiet Skies Coalition, a group that seeks to preserve the well-being of communities on the easternmost reaches of Long Island suffering from noise pollution created by increasing air traffic.

Wolf’s biography The Sugar King: Leon Godchaux, published in 2022, attracted advance praise from distinguished authors and journalists such as Walter Isaacson, Henry Louis Gates Jr., Nicholas B. Lemann, Richard Campanella and Lawrence N. Powell. It unearths the astonishing rise of a forgotten penniless, illiterate Jewish thirteen year old emigrant from France who becomes one of the most remarkable and famous men in the nineteenth century in Louisiana, all while remaining illiterate. His career is twined with the achievements of two Black men.

Wolf's memoir, My New Orleans, Gone Away, was published by Delphinium Books in 2013. The book, which reached the New York Times e-book best seller list in 2016, celebrates New Orleans and explores the issue of growing up as a Jew in the South.

Public service
Wolf has served on the New York Cultural Council, the Executive Committee of the Architectural League of New York, and the Advisory Board of the National Academy of Design. He was chairman of the Van Alen Institute in New York, New York and a trustee of One to World, a program for Fulbright Fellows and other foreign students in the greater New York area. He was appointed to the New York State Advisory Board of The Trust for Public Land. He is currently an Advisory Board member of the Tulane University School of Architecture,  a trustee of Guild Hall and the Village Preservation Society, both in East Hampton where he was a Town-appointed member of the Airport Planning Committee, Noise Subcommittee.

Bibliography

Books
 Eugène Hénard and the Beginning of Urbanism in France 1900–1914 (International Federation of Housing and Planning/Centre de Recherché de Urbanisme, 1969)
 Another Chance for Cities (Whitney Museum of American Art, 1970)
 The Evolving City: Urban Design Proposals by Ulrich Franzen and Paul Rudolph (Whitney Library of Design for American Federation of Arts, 1974)
 The Future of the City: New Directions in Urban Planning (Watson Guptill Publications, 1974)
 Land in America: Its Value, Use and Control (Pantheon Books, 1981)
 Hot Towns: The Future of the Fastest Growing Communities in America (Rutgers University Press, 1999)
 Land Use and Abuse in America: A Call to Action (Xlibris Corporation, 2010)
 My New Orleans, Gone Away – A Memoir of Loss and Renewal (Delphinium Books, 2013)
 The Sugar King: Leon Godchaux, A New Orleans Legend, His Creole Slave, and His Jewish Roots

Selected articles and essays
 “Michelangelo’s Laurenziana and Inconspicuous Traditions,” Marsyas, vol. XII, 1964–1965
 "Space, Time and Urbanism," Art in America, November–December 1966
 "The Urbanization of the Skyscraper," Art in America, September–October 1967
 "The First Modern Urbanist," The Architectural Forum, October 1967
 “The Structure of Motion in the City,” Art in America, no. 1, January–February 1969
 “Blue Hill: A New Concept in Office Park Development” (with E.M. Whitlock), Traffic Engineering, July 1969, vol. 39, no.10
 "Urban Redevelopment 19th-Century Style: Older, Bolder, Ideas for Today," Design Quarterly, 85, Walker Art Center, 1970
 "The Urban Street," Art in America, November–December 1970
 "City Structuring and Social Sense in 19th- and 20th-Century Urbanism," Perspecta, The Yale Architectural Journal, no. 13–14, 1972
 “Preservation, Country-Style: Land Management Comes First,” Council on Architecture, New York State Report, July 1974, vol. 7
 "Rethinking the Urban Street: Its Economic Context" and "Toward an Evaluation of Transportation Potential for the Urban Street" published in On Streets (MIT Press, 1978), p. 189ff., p. 377ff.
 "Forever Farmland: A Proposal for Preserving the Nation's Most Productive Soils," The Amicus Journal, Winter 1982, vol. 3, no. 3
 "Probing Mysteries of Rural Land," APA Planning Journal, June 1982, vol. 48, no. 6

Exhibitions
 Eugène Hénard and Urban Anticipations, Museum of Modern Art, New York (1969)
 Another Chance for Cities, Whitney Museum of American Art, New York (1970)
 Another Chance for Housing, Low-Rise Alternatives, Museum of Modern Art, New York (1973)
 Recapturing Wisdom's Valley: The Watervliet Shaker Heritage, 1775–1975, Albany Institute of History & Art, Albany, New York (1975)

References

Sources
 1957 Class Book, Yale Banner Publications
 Julius Weis, Autobiography of Julius Weis, Goldman's Printing Office, New Orleans, Louisiana, 1908
 Paul L. Godchaux, Jr., The Godchaux Family of New Orleans, self-published, 1971
 Laura Renee Westbrook, "The Godchaux Family in Louisiana History, Literature, and Public Folklore," PhD dissertation, University of Louisiana/Lafayette, 2001
 Course 185: The Development of Cities, Cooper Union School of Architecture, Cooper Union Course Catalog 1977–1987
 "IAUS: The Institute for Architecture and Urban Studies,” published by the Institute for Architecture and Urban Studies, 1979
 "Feasibility Study, Durham Golf Development" for Paul Kempner and Associates, 1969
 "Land Investment Management Study for Sugarland Industries, Inc.," Houston, Texas, 1970
 "Toward an Evaluation Framework for Transportation Planning in the Urban Context" for United States Department of Housing and Urban Development (HUD), Washington, DC, June 1971
 "The Impact of Metro-Flight on Urban Centers and Regional Development in the North-East Corridor" for Pan American World Airways, Inc., 1971
 "Lower Midtown Manhattan Study" for President, Borough of Manhattan and Community Board 5, New York, 1972
 "Shaker Heritage Historic District: South Family Property, Design and Implementation Program," 1973
 "Land Management Study, Watervliet-Shaker Historic and Recreation District" for the Town of Colonie, New York, 1973
 "Historic and Commercial Land Management Report" for East Hampton Town Planning Board, June 1976
 "East Hampton Village Zoning Study: A Report to The Trustees of East Hampton Village" April 1987
 Draft Generic Environmental Impact Statement & Village of East Hampton Comprehensive Plan, adopted February 15, 2002  
 Robin Pogrebin, "Preserving the Home of Thomas Moran, Whose Art Preserves Visions of the West," The New York Times, August 24, 2006 
 Aileen Jacobson, "New Life for a Renowned Painter's House," The New York Times, March 215, 2009 
 Jeremy D. Samuelson, "The Lay of the Land," The East Hampton Star, April 27, 2011  
 Jonathan Yardley, "Rising above Bias in the Big Easy," The Washington Post, July 7, 2013   
 Winston Groom, "The Place He Was Once From," Wall Street Journal, July 19, 2013  
 Lori Ferguson, "Profile: Peter Wolf '53," The Exeter Bulletin, Winter 2014 
 Michael Patrick Welch, "Vanished Culture," The New Orleans Advocate, January 11, 2014 
 Joanne Pilgrim, "Aircraft Noise Sets Off a Primal Scream," The East Hampton Star,  September 4, 2014 
 Joanne Pilgrim, "Big Players in New Push to Rein in Airport," The East Hampton Star, November 24, 2014 
 Joanne Pilgrim, "Packed Hearing on Airport Noise," The East Hampton Star, March 19, 2015  
 James Barron, "As Din of Aircraft Grows, East Hampton Reclaims Power to Regulate Airport," The New York Times, January 4, 2015

External links

 OCLC WorldCat website: "IAUS publications and content"
 Sandra Cantey Obituary, The East Hampton Star
 Thomas Moran Trust
 Quiet Skies Coalition
 The Trust for Public Land
 One to World

20th-century American architects
Land use
1935 births
Living people
New York University Institute of Fine Arts alumni
Yale University alumni
Tulane University alumni
Phillips Exeter Academy alumni
21st-century American architects